Nicholai Olivia Rothschild ( Hilton, October 5, 1983) is an American socialite, fashion designer and model. She is a member of the Hilton family by birth, and a member of the Rothschild family through her marriage to James Rothschild, a grandson of Victor Rothschild, 3rd Baron Rothschild, in 2015.

Early life 
Hilton was born in New York City and raised in Los Angeles. She is the younger daughter of Richard Hilton, a hotel heir of the Hilton family who works as a businessman in real estate, and of Kathy Hilton (née Avanzino), a former actress and half-sister of Kim and Kyle Richards. Hilton was named for her granduncle, Conrad "Nicky" Hilton Jr. She is the second of four children: she has an older sister, Paris Hilton (born 1981), and two younger brothers, Barron Hilton II (born 1989) and Conrad Hilton III (born 1994).

Hilton was raised Catholic. She has Norwegian, German, Italian, English, Irish, and Scottish ancestry. Hilton graduated from Convent of the Sacred Heart, an all-girls Catholic school on the Upper East Side, in 2001. She took courses at Fashion Institute of Technology and Parsons The New School for Design but does not have a degree.

Career

Fashion design 
In 2004, Hilton launched her own clothing line. She also designed a line of handbags for Japanese company Samantha Thavasa. In 2007, she started her second line, Nicholai, at a higher price point. Nicholai held its fashion show for the spring/summer 2008 season on September 9, 2007, in New York City during Mercedes-Benz Fashion Week. In 2014, Hilton launched a 10-piece collection with eLuxe. She designed each piece as a reflection of her personal style and named all products for the women in her family, who embody the style of each piece.

In 2010, Hilton launched a line of jewelry. The pieces are fashion jewelry and in an Art Deco style, averaging around $200 per piece. In 2015, she launched a capsule collection of handbags as part of a collaboration with Linea Pelle. Hilton said she was approached by Linea Pelle "to make a capsule collection and I really wanted to have it be classic. As in I didn't want to make these super trendy bags that would be out of style next season."

In August 2017, Hilton announced her collaboration with Tolani for a Mommy and Me capsule collection. The collection launched in stores in spring 2018. In 2019 Hilton launched a second collection with Tolani inspired by her travels. In February 2019, Hilton announced her first footwear collection in partnership with French Sole. The line, known as Nicky Hilton x French Sole, officially launched in September 2019.

Modeling 
In 2005, Hilton was the face of Australian underwear line Antz Pantz alongside Kimberly Stewart. Stewart remains contracted, but Hilton has been replaced by Australian model Megan Maitland. Around this time, Hilton modeled for the cover of Lucire for its New Zealand and Romanian editions.

Other ventures 

In 2006, Hilton entered a partnership to open two Nicky O Hotels, the first in Miami and the second in Chicago. That same year, she sued her partner in Federal Court in Los Angeles for damages and to seek an injunction against his use of the name. On February 12, 2007, Hilton was sued for breach of contract by her partners.

In 2014, she published her first book, 365 Style, published by Harlequin, a subsidiary of HarperCollins.

In 2015, Hilton collaborated with Smashbox, the cosmetic brand owned by Estée Lauder Companies, to create a cosmetic line consisting of three limited-edition cat-inspired makeup kits (one for each of her favorite cities: New York City, Los Angeles and London).

Philanthropy 
Hilton has supported a range of charitable organizations, including Starlight Children's Foundation, Make-a-wish Foundation, Race to Erase MS and Union Rescue Mission.

Personal life 
At 2:30 a.m. on August 15, 2004, Hilton married childhood friend and businessman Todd Meister at the Vegas Wedding Chapel in Las Vegas, Nevada. The marriage was annulled less than three months later, with Hilton and Meister explaining they traveled apart often and had married "on a whim".

In 2011, Hilton began dating financier James Rothschild (born 1985), a member of the Rothschild family and only son of Amschel Rothschild. On August 12, 2014, Hilton became engaged to Rothschild.

On July 10, 2015, the couple married at The Orangery in Kensington Palace Gardens in London, England. Hilton wore a $77,000 Valentino Haute Couture gown. Her sister, Paris, served as maid of honor. The couple honeymooned in Botswana. They have three children: daughters (born July 2016 and December 2017) and a son (born July 2022).

References

External links 

 
 
 
 
 
 
 

1983 births
Living people
American cosmetics businesspeople
American fashion businesspeople
American fashion designers
Female models from New York (state)
American hoteliers
American marketing businesspeople
American socialites
American women in business
Businesspeople from Los Angeles
Fashion influencers
Conrad Hilton family
Convent of the Sacred Heart (NYC) alumni
Schools of the Sacred Heart alumni
Fashion Institute of Technology people
Marketing women
Richards family
Nicky
American women bloggers
American bloggers
American women fashion designers
21st-century American women